This is a list of people and other topics appearing on the cover of Time magazine in the 1920s. Time was first published in 1923. As Time became established as one of the United States' leading news magazines, an appearance on the cover of Time became an indicator of notability, fame or notoriety. Such features were accompanied by articles.

For other decades, see List of covers of Time magazine.

1923

 March 3 – Joseph G. Cannon
 March 10 – Warren G. Harding
 March 17 – Hugo Stinnes
 March 24 – Mustafa Kemal Atatürk
 March 31 – Stephen Sanford
 April 7 – Joseph Conrad
 April 14 – Winston Churchill
 April 21 – Samuel M. Vauclain
 April 28 – Fuad I of Egypt
 May 5 – James M. Beck
 May 12 – John Barton Payne
 May 19 – René Viviani
 May 28 – Franklin D. Roosevelt
 June 4 – John L. Lewis
 June 11 – Herbert L. Pratt
 June 18 – Burton K. Wheeler
 June 25 – Edward M. House
 July 2 – Andrew Mellon
 July 9 – Mason M. Patrick
 July 16 – James Couzens
 July 23 – Roy Asa Haynes
 July 30 – Eleanora Duse
 August 6 – Benito Mussolini
 August 13 – Samuel George Blythe
 August 20 – F. E. Smith, 1st Earl of Birkenhead
 August 27 – Frederick G. Banting
 September 3 – David Lloyd George
 September 10 – Jack Dempsey
 September 17 – Israel Zangwill
 September 24 – J. P. Morgan, Jr.
 October 1 – Samuel Gompers
 October 8 – H. H. Asquith
 October 15 – Frank O. Lowden
 October 22 – John W. Weeks
 October 29 – Roy Chapman Andrews
 November 5 – Giulio Gatti-Casazza
 November 12 – Woodrow Wilson
 November 19 – Erich Ludendorff
 November 26 – Hugh S. Gibson
 December 3 – Robert M. La Follette, Sr.
 December 10 – Albert Baird Cummins
 December 17 – Anton Lang
 December 24 – George Bernard Shaw
 December 31 – Anthony H. G. Fokker

1924

 January 7 – William G. McAdoo
 January 14 – Bishop William Lawrence
 January 21 – Henry Cabot Lodge
 January 28 – Herbert B. Swope
 February 4 – Edward Eberle
 February 11 – John Hessin Clarke
 February 18 – Eleutherios Venizelos
 February 25 – Bernard M. Baruch
 March 3 – Reginald McKenna
 March 10 – Warren Stanford Stone
 March 17 – Eugene O'Neill
 March 24 – Raymond Poincaré
 March 31 – George Eastman
 April 7 – King George V
 April 14 – George Fisher Baker
 April 21 – Lou Henry Hoover
 April 28 – Gelasio Caetani
 May 5 – William E. Borah
 May 12 – Homer Saint-Gaudens
 May 19 – Henry Seidel Canby
 May 26 – Sir James Craig
 June 2 – Alfred von Tirpitz
 June 9 – Carter Glass
 June 16 – Pius XI
 June 23 – Hiram W. Evans
 June 30 – William Howard Taft
 July 7 – James Stillman Rockefeller
 July 14 – Alexey Rykov
 July 21 – Gaston Doumergue
 July 28 – William Sproule
 August 4 – Queen Marie
 August 11 – John J. Pershing
 August 18 – Ramsay MacDonald
 August 25 – Edith Cummings
 September 1 – Adolph S. Ochs
 September 8 – Wu Pei-fu
 September 15 – Seymour Parker Gilbert
 September 22 – Leo H. Baekeland
 September 29 – Hiram Johnson
 October 6 – William Allen White
 October 13 – Glenn H. Curtiss
 October 20 – Sir Patrick Hastings
 October 27 – Sigmund Freud
 November 3 – Sir Thomas Lipton
 November 10 – Ethel Barrymore
 November 17 – Frederick Huntington Gillett
 November 24 – William R. Inge
 December 1 – Chauncey M. Depew
 December 8 – Plutarco Calles
 December 15 – Dwight F. Davis
 December 22 – King Alfonso XIII
 December 29 – Charles Evans Hughes

1925

 January 5 – Juan Belmonte
 January 12 – Albert, Duke of York
 January 19 – John D. Rockefeller, Jr.
 January 26 – Charles B. Warren
 February 2 – Fritz Kreisler
 February 9 – William Lyon Mackenzie King
 February 16 – Harry S. New
 February 23 – Owen D. Young
 March 2 – Amy Lowell
 March 9 – Nicholas Longworth
 March 16 – Marshal Ferdinand Foch
 March 23 – Eduard Benes
 March 30 – George Harold Sisler
 April 6 – John Ringling
 April 13 – Arthur Balfour
 April 20 – Walter P. Chrysler
 April 27 – James B. Hertzog
 May 4 – Thomas J. Walsh
 May 11 – Winston Churchill
 May 18 – Leon Trotsky
 May 25 – Thomas A. Edison
 June 1 – Richard Swann Lull
 June 8 – Miguel Primo de Rivera
 June 15 – Victor Emmanuel III of Italy
 June 22 – Charles Horace Mayo
 June 29 – Theodore E. Burton
 July 6 – Charlie Chaplin
 July 13 – Alfred E. Smith
 July 20 – George Gershwin
 July 27 – Henry Ford
 August 3 – Lincoln C. Andrews
 August 10 – Stanley Baldwin
 August 17 – Abd el-Krim
 August 24 – F. Trubee Davison
 August 31 – Bobby Jones
 September 7 – Joseph Caillaux
 September 14 – Zachary Lansdowne
 September 21 – Harry Emerson Fosdick
 September 28 – Frank B. Kellogg
 October 5 – Red Grange
 October 12 – Dwight W. Morrow
 October 19 – Louis D. Brandeis
 October 26 – Admiral William S. Sims
 November 2 – Otto H. Kahn
 November 9 – Paul Painlevé & Aristide Briand
 November 16 – Herbert Hoover
 November 23 – Gifford Pinchot
 November 30 – Austen Chamberlain
 December 7 – José R. Capablanca
 December 14 – Charles G. Dawes
 December 21 – Booth Tarkington
 December 28 – James Wadsworth, Jr.

1926

 January 4 – Georges Clemenceau
 January 11 – Jimmy Walker
 January 18 – Arthur Capper
 January 25 – Arturo Toscanini
 February 1 – Henry Bérenger
 February 8 – Alfred Stearns
 February 15 – Lady Diana Manners
 February 22 – Ellen Browning Scripps
 March 1 – Marion N. Talley
 March 8 – Robert Todd Lincoln
 March 15 – Oliver Wendell Holmes, Jr.
 March 22 – Paul von Hindenburg
 March 29 – Andrew J. Volstead
 April 5 – Alanson B. Houghton
 April 12 – Lord Irwin
 April 19 – Leonard Wood
 April 26 – Raquel Meller
 May 3 – King Haakon VII
 May 10 – John Hays Hammond
 May 17 – Philip Albright Small Franklin
 May 24 – Albert C. Ritchie
 May 31 – Cardinal Mundelein
 June 7 – Józef Piłsudski
 June 14 – Carrie Chapman Catt
 June 21 – A. Lawrence Lowell
 June 28 – Kaiser Wilhelm
 July 5 – Elbert Henry Gary
 July 12 – Benito Mussolini
 July 19 – Will Rogers
 July 26 – Helen Wills
 August 2 – Gaston Doumergue
 August 9 – George E. Brennan
 August 16 – Arthur Brisbane
 August 23 – René Fonck
 August 30 – Gene Tunney
 September 6 – Pietro Mascagni
 September 13 – Will H. Hays
 September 20 – H. G. Wells
 September 27 – Rudyard Kipling
 October 4 – William H. "Big Bill" Edwards
 October 11 – Ogden L. Mills
 October 18 – Elihu Root
 October 25 – George B. Harvey
 November 1 – Giulio Gatti-Casazza
 November 8 – Heihachiro Togo
 November 15 – Henry Sloane Coffin
 November 22 – Charles M. Schwab
 November 29 – Samuel Insull
 December 6 – Guglielmo Marconi
 December 13 – Ralph A. Cram
 December 20 – Charles Curtis
 December 27 – Alfred P. Sloan, Jr.

1927

 January 3 – Leopold C. Amery
 January 10 – James J. Davis
 January 17 – Charles Copeland
 January 24 – Richard Strauss
 January 31 – Pierre S. du Pont
 February 7 – Alice Roosevelt Longworth
 February 14 – Mortimer L. Schiff
 February 21 – Mustafa Kemal Atatürk
 February 28 – Ray Lyman Wilbur
 March 7 – James A. Reed
 March 14 – Sinclair Lewis
 March 21 – Paul Claudel
 March 28 – Charles Dana Gibson
 April 4 – Chiang Kai-shek
 April 11 – Cornelius McGillicuddy
 April 18 – Nellie Melba
 April 25 – Robert Andrews Millikan
 May 2 – Michael Arlen
 May 9 – Charles Frederick Hughes
 May 16 – Julius Klein
 May 25 – André Tardieu
 May 30 – George V & Queen Mary
 June 6 – James A. Farrell
 June 13 – John Joseph Kennedy
 June 20 – Smedley Butler
 June 27 – Nicholas Murray Butler & John McGraw
 July 4 – Giuseppe Mario Bellanca
 July 11 – Ion I. C. Brătianu
 July 18 – Hugh S. Gibson
 July 25 – Wallace Farrington
 August 1 – Michael of Romania
 August 8 – Prince Edward, Prince Henry & Prince George
 August 15 – William Randolph Hearst
 August 22 – Max Reinhardt
 August 29 – Charles Henry Brent
 September 5 – Devereux Milburn
 September 12 – E. Phillips Oppenheim
 September 19 – Roger Wolfe Kahn
 September 26 – Howard Paul Savage
 October 3 – Graham McNamee
 October 10 – William M. Butler
 October 17 – Nikita Balieff
 October 24 – Bishop Freeman
 October 31 – Alfred Hertz
 November 7 – Knute Rockne
 November 14 – Newton D. Baker
 November 21 – Leon Trotsky
 November 28 – Frank Orren Lowden
 December 5 – Geraldine Farrar
 December 12 – Robert M. La Follette, Jr.
 December 19 – Aristide Briand
 December 26 – Stanley Baldwin

1928

 January 2 – Charles Lindbergh
 January 9 – Thomas Campbell
 January 16 – Calvin Coolidge
 January 23 –  Ignacy Jan Paderewski
 January 30 – Myron T. Herrick
 February 6 – Vincent Astor
 February 13 – Eugene O'Neill
 February 20 – Charles Frederick Hughes
 February 27 – Baby Basset Hound
 March 5 – Tomáš Garrigue Masaryk
 March 12 – Bernard Baruch
 March 19 – Robert Dollar
 March 26 – Herbert Hoover
 April 2 – Amadeo Giannini
 April 9 – Harry F. Sinclair
 April 16 – George Eastman
 April 23 – Ruth Hanna McCormick
 April 30 – Alfred E. Smith
 May 7 – Robert McCormick & Joseph Medill Patterson
 May 14 – Florenz Ziegfeld
 May 21 – John D. Rockefeller
 May 28 – Andrew W. Mellon
 June 4 – John Dewey
 June 11 – Charles G. Dawes
 June 18 – Charles Curtis
 June 25 – Joseph Taylor Robinson
 July 2 – Feng Yuxiang
 July 9 – Rogers Hornsby
 July 16 – Julian Byng
 July 23 – King Alfonso XIII
 July 30 – Melvin A. Traylor
 August 6 – Albert I
 August 13 – Jean Philippe Worth
 August 20 – Richard Evelyn Byrd
 August 27 – Frank R. Kent
 September 3 – Jed Harris
 September 10 – Augustus John
 September 17 – Grace Coolidge
 September 24 – James William Good
 October 1 – Alexander Meiklejohn
 October 8 – William Howard Taft
 October 15 – Harry F. Byrd
 October 22 – Philip La Follette
 October 29 – Lord Melchett
 November 5 – The American people
 November 12 – Maria Jeritza
 November 19 – Emperor Hirohito
 November 26 – Mikhail Kalinin
 December 3 – Orville Wright
 December 10 – Arthur W. Cutten
 December 17 – Christ the Redeemer of the Andes
 December 24 – William Henry O'Connell
 December 31 – Henry Fairfield Osborn

1929

 January 7 – Walter Chrysler
 January 14 – Adolph Zukor
 January 21 – James Simpson
 January 28 – Afranio do Amaral
 February 4 – Clarence C. Little
 February 11 – King Alexander
 February 18 – Albert Einstein
 February 25 – J. P. Morgan Jr.
 March 4 – Walter Hampden
 March 11 – Henry L. Stimson
 March 18 – Billy Barton
 March 25 – Crown Prince Olaf and Crown Princess Märtha
 April 1 – Prince Edward
 April 8 – Reed Smoot
 April 15 – Edgar Wallace
 April 22 – Myron C. Taylor
 April 29 – Princess Elizabeth
 May 6 – Harlan F. Stone
 May 13 – Lou Henry Hoover
 May 20 – Jimmy Walker
 May 27 – Edward Dean Adams
 June 3 – Francis Scott McBride
 June 10 – Oil State Governors (Billy Adams, Dan Moody, Frank Emerson, Clyde M. Reed, John Edward Erickson, William Judson Holloway, George Dern, Richard C. Dillon, Clement Calhoun Young)
 June 17 – Livingston Farrand
 June 24 – Max Schmeling
 July 1 – Helen Wills Moody
 July 8 – Lawrence M. Judd
 July 15 – David Sarnoff
 July 22 – Alvan Macauley
 July 29 – Jimmie Foxx
 August 5 – Arthur M. Hyde
 August 12 – Paul Shoup
 August 19 – Montagu C. Norman
 August 26 – Mabel Walker Willebrandt
 September 2 – James William Good
 September 9 – Graham Bethune Grosvenor
 September 16 – Hugo Eckener
 September 23 – Christian K. Cagle
 September 30 – Ina Claire
 October 7 – Ramsay MacDonald
 October 14 – William Wrigley Jr.
 October 21 – Harry Guggenheim
 October 28 – Ivar Kreuger
 November 4 – Samuel Insull
 November 11 – Thomas W. Lamont
 November 18 – Lewis Edward Lawes
 November 25 – Eva Le Gallienne
 December 2 – Robert Bridges
 December 9 – Walter C. Teagle
 December 16 – Nicholas Longworth
 December 23 – Wendell Cushing Neville
 December 30 – Pascual Ortiz Rubio

See also
 Lists of covers of Time magazine

References

 Time Cover Search
 Time The Vault

Notes 

Time magazine (1920s)
1920s
Cover of Time magazine